Viraat Ramayan Mandir is an upcoming Hindu temple complex in Kesaria, Bihar, India, with an estimated budget of . When completed, it will be the largest religious monument in the world. The Virat Ramayan Mandir will be almost double the height of the world-famous 12th century Angkor Wat temple complex in Cambodia, which is 215 feet high. The temple will have a hall with a seating capacity of 20,000 people. The construction of the temple is scheduled to start in June 2015, but has since been delayed following the Cambodia government's protest to the government of India.

Planning
The temple is inspired from the Angkor Wat Temple in Cambodia and Rameshwaram and Minakashi Temples in India. The temple will comprise 18 homes for various Hindu gods with focus on Lord Rama and Sita. The plan is spearheaded by Acharya Kishore Kunal.

Patna based, Mahavir Mandir Trust first proposed the project, under the name of Viraat Angkor Wat Ram Mandir in Hajipur, the twin city of Patna. But temple trust acquired 161 acres of land in East Champaran district and therefore the earlier site of Hajipur had been abandoned.

In August 2012, after the concern and sentiment of the Cambodia Government, when Indian Government asked Mahavir Mandir Trust not to build the exact replica of Angkor Wat. The trust changed the name from Virat Angkor Wat Ram Temple to Virat Ramayan Mandir. 
On November 13, 2013, Bihar chief minister Nitish Kumar unveiled a model of the temple.

Location
It is located at a distance of 60 km from Vaishali and at a distance of 120 km from Patna, the capital of Bihar, 13 km from Chakia, and 96 km from Raxaul. Its exact location is at Janaki Nagar near Kesaria in North Bihar. It will be spread over an area of 200 acres at Bahuara-Kathwalia villages on Kesariya-Chakia road in East Champaran district. It will be 2800 ft in length, 1400 ft in width and 405 ft in height.

See also

Vrindavan Chandrodaya Mandir
 Mahavir Mandir

References

External links
 Official website of Mahavir Mandir Trust
 

Hindu temples in Bihar
Rama temples
East Champaran district
Buildings and structures under construction in India